James Tanner (born 1976) is an English chef and television personality.

James Tanner may also refer to:
 James C. Tanner (1926–2019), American journalist
 James R. Tanner (1844–1927), American soldier and civil servant
 James Mourilyan Tanner (1920–2010), British paediatric endocrinologist
 James T. Tanner (1858–1915), English stage director and dramatist
 James Tanner (singer), contestant on The X Factor
 Jim Tanner, sports and entertainment agent
 Gid Tanner (James Gideon Tanner, 1885–1960), American old-time fiddler